Kevin Roelandts (born 27 August 1982) is a Belgian midfielder who currently plays for Maldegem. He is a technical, clever and hard-working central midfielder. He also plays a full back. He has played for the Belgium national football team.

Biography 
Roelandts played for the youth set up at Club Brugge. In 2002, he went into the A-Team.  His debut came against VfB Stuttgart, in the UEFA Europa League. He made his debut in the Champions league 1 year later against Celta Vigo (1-1), where in the last minutes of the game he prived a brilliant assist for Rune Lange. This meant Club Brugge were still in contention for the next round.  Roelandts got 13 appearances that season under manager Trond Sollied, but did not succeed to get a fixed place in the side. In the 2005-2006 season, under manager Jan Ceulemans, Roelandts nailed a starting place at the club. By the beginning of the 2006-2007 season Roelandts had lost his place in the side.  After negative remarks over teammate Brian Priske in November 2006, he was relegated to the B-Team. In December 2006 he was told he could leave Club Brugge. Passings Belgian clubs had been interested, but Roelandts finally chose to be loaned out to K.F.C. Germinal Beerschot. In June 2007, he signed a 3-year contract at SV Zulte Waregem.

International career
Roelandts was called up for Belgium's Kirin Cup matches against Chile and Japan. He made his debut in the match against Chile on 29 May 2009 and scored once.

Honours
Club Brugge
 Belgian First Division A: 2004–05
 Belgian Cup: 2003–04
 Belgian Super Cup: 2004, 2005

References

External links 
 Kevin Roelandts stats 

1982 births
Beerschot A.C. players
Club Brugge KV players
S.V. Zulte Waregem players
Oud-Heverlee Leuven players
Royal Antwerp F.C. players
Association football midfielders
Living people
Belgian footballers
Belgium international footballers
Belgian Pro League players
Challenger Pro League players
Footballers from Bruges